Hanif Bali (born 10 April 1987) is a Swedish politician of the Moderate Party and a former board member of the party. He was member of the Riksdag for Stockholm County between 2010 and 2022. He lives in Österåker, Åkersberga, where he is now active in municipal politics. 

Bali arrived in Sweden unaccompanied from Iran at the age of 3, and lived most of his childhood in different foster families. He studied at Uppsala University after finishing gymnasium. Prior to becoming a full-time politician, Bali worked as a programmer and web developer. He worked for the Moderate Party as a webmaster from 2006 to 2007.

Prior to the 2010 Swedish general election, he stood as number 9 on the ticket for the Swedish Riksdag in Stockholm County and was thus the youngest and highest placed newcomer in the Moderate Party in the region. In the Swedish Riksdag, Bali was a permanent member of the Labour Market Committee and a deputy in the Education Committee. He was responsible for integration issues in the Labour Market Committee of the Moderate Party. He also runs a business as an IT consultant.

He is known for being outspoken on Twitter, which has resulted in multiple controversies and comparisons with both US President Donald Trump and political pundit Milo Yiannopoulos for his attacks on political opponents as well as the direct nature of his tweets. In early September of 2021, an internal and subsequently an ongoing police investigation was initiated into accusations of sexual misconduct against minors, and he was relieved from all political assignments pending further investigation.

Bali has carried out fundraising activities to collect funds for crime victims. Bali supports the legalization of cannabis to fight drug traffickers and organized crime.

References

External links 
 Hanif Bali at the Swedish Riksdag
 Heja Hanif - Hanif Balis webpage

1987 births
Members of the Riksdag 2010–2014
Members of the Riksdag 2014–2018
Members of the Riksdag 2018–2022
People from Kermanshah
Iranian emigrants to Sweden
Living people
Swedish politicians of Iranian descent
Swedish politicians of Kurdish descent
Uppsala University alumni
Members of the Riksdag from the Moderate Party